Louis Rosenberg may refer to:
 Louis Conrad Rosenberg, (1890–1983), American printmaker
 Louis Rosenberg (judge) (1898–1999), United States federal judge
 Lou Rosenberg (1904–1991), American professional baseball player
 Louis B. Rosenberg, (born 1969) American engineer, researcher, inventor, and entrepreneur